The 2012 Intersport Heilbronn Open was a professional tennis tournament played on hard courts. It was the 25th edition of the tournament which was part of the 2012 ATP Challenger Tour. It took place in Heilbronn, Germany between 23 and 29 January 2012.

Singles main-draw entrants

Seeds

 1 Rankings are as of January 16, 2012.

Other entrants
The following players received wildcards into the singles main draw:
  Benjamin Becker 
  Bastian Knittel
  Kevin Krawietz
  Gilles Müller

The following players received entry from the qualifying draw:
  Ruben Bemelmans
  Marcin Gawron
  Dominik Meffert
  Mischa Zverev

Champions

Singles

 Björn Phau def.  Ruben Bemelmans, 6–7(4–7), 6–3, 6–4

Doubles

 Johan Brunström /  Frederik Nielsen def.  Treat Conrad Huey /  Dominic Inglot, 6–3, 3–6, [10–6]

External links
Official Website
ITF Search
ATP official site

Intersport Heilbronn Open
Intersport Heilbronn Open
2012 in German tennis
2010s in Baden-Württemberg
January 2012 sports events in Germany